Anna Dmitriyevna Nagornyuk (born 10 January 1996) is a Russian ice dancer who competed for Uzbekistan with Viktor Kovalenko until mid-2013. Together, they placed 10th at the 2013 World Junior Championships.

Career 
Nagornyuk began competing internationally with Viktor Kovalenko for Uzbekistan in the 2011–2012 season, appearing on both the junior and senior levels. They competed on the 2011–12 ISU Junior Grand Prix series and then made their senior international debut at the 2012 Four Continents where they placed 8th. Nagornyuk and Kovalenko finished 12th at the 2012 World Junior Championships and were then scheduled to compete on the senior level at the 2012 World Championships. Although Nagornyuk was granted her visa a week earlier, Kovalenko received his on the morning of 26 March, the same day they were scheduled to compete in the preliminary round. They arrived in Nice, France, half an hour before they were due to compete and reached the arena ten minutes before competing, but were able to qualify for the short dance.

In the 2012–13 season, Nagornyuk and Kovalenko placed 10th at both the Four Continents Championships and World Junior Championships. They parted ways at the end of the season.

Programs 
(with Kovalenko)

Competitive highlights 
(with Kovalenko)

References

External links 

 

Uzbekistani female ice dancers
Russian female ice dancers
1996 births
Living people
Figure skaters from Moscow